The 2014 Indian Aces season (officially the 2014 Micromax Indian Aces season pursuant to a sponsorship agreement with Micromax Informatics Ltd., the team's current owner) is the inaugural season of the franchise playing in the International Premier Tennis League (IPTL).

Season recap

Founding of franchise
On 21 January 2014, IPTL announced that one of the charter franchises for the league inaugural 2014 season would be based in Delhi. On 19 June 2014, an IPTL press release revealed to the general public that the owner of the Indian franchise was Micromax Informatics Ltd. which preferred to have the team play its home matches in New Delhi and not in Mumbai. A group called PVP Ventures led by entrepreneur Prasad V Potluri and cricket legend Sachin Tendulkar had been the original franchise owners with a plan to play home matches in Mumbai. While league managing director Mahesh Bhupathi said PVP Ventures had been replaced by Micromax, because PVP missed a payment deadline, PVP said it had withdrawn from the league due to lack of clarity over how IPTL's business model was progressing and disagreements over player contracts. PVP did not want the team to be solely responsible for payment of player salaries and favored  the league being obligated as well.

Inaugural draft
The Indian Aces participated in the IPTL inaugural draft on 2 March 2014, in Dubai, United Arab Emirates. Players selected by Aces were

Team name
By May 2014, the team was named the Indian Aces.

Home venue
On 25 July 2014, the Aces announced that their home matches would be played at Indira Gandhi Indoor Stadium in New Delhi, Delhi.

Injury to Rafael Nadal and signing of Roger Federer
On 22 September 2014, the Aces announced that Rafael Nadal will not play due to an injury. As a replacement, the Aces signed Roger Federer.

First coach
On 27 October 2014, Fabrice Santoro was named the Aces' first coach.

Event chronology
 21 January 2014: IPTL announced that one of the charter franchises for the league inaugural 2014 season would be in India.
 2 March: The Delhi franchise participated in the IPTL inaugural draft.
 10 May: The Delhi franchise was named the Indian Aces.
 25 July: The Aces announced that their home matches would be played at Indira Gandhi Indoor Stadium in New Delhi, Delhi.
 22 September: The Aces signed Roger Federer to replace Rafael Nadal who will not play due to an injury.
 27 October: Fabrice Santoro was named the Aces' first coach.
 28 November: The Indian Aces defeated the Singapore Slammers, 26–16, in the first match in IPTL history. Rohan Bopanna served the first point of the league's inaugural match.
 30 November: The Aces defeated the UAE Royals, 28–20, in a matchup of two previously unbeaten teams. The Aces improved their record to 3 wins and 0 losses and moved into first place in the league standings.
3 December: The Aces suffer their first defeat in the 2014 season to the home team, Singapore Slammers.
13 December The Aces finish at the top of the league table and are subsequently declared IPTL champions of 2014.

Match log

{| align="center" border="1" cellpadding="2" cellspacing="1" style="border:1px solid #aaa"
|-
! colspan="2" style="background:#138808; color:orange" | Legend
|-
! bgcolor="ccffcc" | Aces Win
! bgcolor="ffbbbb" | Aces Loss
|-
! colspan="2" | Home team in CAPS(including coin-flip winners)
|}

Key: MS = men's singles; MD = men's doubles; WS = women's singles; XD = mixed doubles; LS = legends' singles; OT = overtime (additional games played in extended fifth sets); SO = men's singles super shoot-out

Roster
Reference:
  Fabrice Santoro – Player-Coach
  Rohan Bopanna
  Roger Federer
  Ana Ivanovic
  Sania Mirza
  Gaël Monfils
  Rafael Nadal – injured, will not play
  Pete Sampras

Player transactions
 22 September 2014: The Aces signed Roger Federer to replace Rafael Nadal who will not play due to an injury.

Television coverage
Television coverage of Aces matches in India will be provided by STAR Sports.

See also

References

External links
Indian Aces official website
International Premier Tennis League official website

Indian Aces season
2014 in Indian tennis